The Wisconsin Historical Museum is a museum located on the Capitol Square in Madison, Wisconsin. It is currently open only for retail shopping featuring books, gifts, and other items focusing on Wisconsin and history.

History 
The museum featured information about the history of Wisconsin and is operated by the Wisconsin Historical Society. In addition to Wisconsin history, it provided information about other American history topics through artifacts, photographs, full-scale dioramas, audio-visual presentations, and interactive multimedia programs. In late 2004, the museum's existence was threatened due to budget cuts, but citing its role in the state's history, Wisconsin governor Jim Doyle restored its funding.

In addition to exhibits about traditional aspect of the state's history, the museum has also offered an exhibition on malted milk, which was first made in Wisconsin, and includes in its permanent collection a Big Boy, the mascot of a hamburger chain, rescued in 1985 when its restaurant closed. The museum also opened in 2012 an exhibit about Butch Vig's (of Madison's Garbage (band)) Smart Studios, a Madison recording facility that closed in 2010. In late 2022, the museum closed down its exhibits in order to prepare for construction of a planned new Wisconsin History Center, to open in 2026.

References

External links
 Wisconsin Historical Museum

Museums in Madison, Wisconsin
Wisconsin Historical Society
History museums in Wisconsin
Historical society museums in Wisconsin
Food museums in the United States